Belarusian Orthodox Church may refer to:

 Belarusian Orthodox Church, canonical branch of the Eastern Orthodox Church in Belarus
 Belarusian Autocephalous Orthodox Church, established in 1922

See also
 Christianity in Belarus
 Belarusian Church (disambiguation)
 Belarusian Catholic Church